Kaurna is a single-member electoral district for the South Australian House of Assembly. Named after the Kaurna aboriginal tribe which originally inhabited the Adelaide plains, it is a 44.7 km² semi-urban electorate on Adelaide's far-southern beaches, taking in the suburbs of Hackham, Huntfield Heights, Maslin Beach, Moana, Noarlunga Downs, Old Noarlunga, Port Noarlunga South, Seaford, Seaford Heights, Seaford Meadows and Seaford Rise, as well as part of Onkaparinga Hills. It is one of two state districts named after South Australia's indigenous people (the other being the electoral district of Narungga).

History
Replacing the abolished seat of Baudin, Kaurna was created in the 1991 electoral distribution as a marginal Labor seat. It was first contested at the 1993 election, where it was won by Liberal candidate Lorraine Rosenberg as part of a large swing throughout the state. However, she was swept away at the 1997 election, with John Hill reclaiming the seat for Labor. For most of the time since then, it has been a fairly safe to safe Labor seat, as its predecessor Baudin had been for most of its existence.

John Hill resigned from parliament at the 2014 election, replaced by Labor's Chris Picton.

Members for Kaurna

Election results

Notes

References
 ECSA profile for Kaurna: 2018
 ABC profile for Kaurna: 2018
 Poll Bludger profile for Kaurna: 2018

1993 establishments in Australia
Electoral districts of South Australia